Sechüma is a village in Kohima District of Nagaland state of India.

References

Villages in Kohima district